Great Western Railway 7800 Class No. 7827 Lydham Manor is a preserved British steam locomotive. It is currently (March 2013) owned by and based on the Dartmouth Steam Railway.

The locomotive was built in December 1950. Its first shed allocation was at Chester. In March 1959, its shed allocation was moved to Oswestry. It conducted improved draughting tests in February 1954. In May 1965, it received its last shed allocation at Shrewsbury. No. 7827 was withdrawn in October 1965 and acquired by Woodham's of Barry, Wales, in May 1966. It was sold to Dart Valley Railway and left the scrapyard as the fifth departure from Barry in June 1970. No. 7827 was restored in 1972.

It carried the Great Western Livery, which it would never have carried while in mainline service, as it was built two years after the end of the Great Western Railway (GWR). In 2011, Lydham Manor was reintroduced at the Churston Heritage Festival carrying British Rail all-black livery and bearing the temporary nameplates Torquay Manor and number plates of No. 7800 for the festival.

Lydham Manor has been on loan to other heritage railways/centres including, Didcot Railway Centre in 2010 before it was painted in BR black, South Devon Railway in a visit for September 2013, and then traveling to West Somerset Railway in October 2013 for the steam gala festival .

Allocations

7827
Railway locomotives introduced in 1950
7827
Standard gauge steam locomotives of Great Britain